Barnet Hospital is a district general hospital situated in Barnet, in North London. It is managed by the Royal Free London NHS Foundation Trust.

Overview
The original hospital on the site was the Wellhouse Hospital which was opened by Viscount Hampden, the Lord Lieutenant of Hertfordshire, in November 1920. It was renamed Barnet General Hospital in 1950.

The rebuilding of the hospital was procured under a Private Finance Initiative contract in 1999. The works were designed by the Percy Thomas Partnership and carried out by Bouygues at a cost of £54 million. They were completed in February 2002 and the new facilities were opened by the Princess Royal in February 2003. Barnet General Hospital became Barnet Hospital at that time.

The new facilities provided include accident and emergency care, intensive care, internal medicine, surgery, gynecology, orthopaedics, anesthetics, haematology, stroke medicine, dermatology, paediatrics and genito-urinary medicine.

Since July 2014, the hospital has been part of the Royal Free London NHS Foundation Trust along with Chase Farm Hospital.

Transport links
Barnet Hospital is served by London Buses routes 107, 263, 307, 384, school routes 606, 634, night route N20 and non-TfL route 614. The closest Underground station is High Barnet, which is a 15-minute walk away. On site parking has been highlighted by Which? as having the highest minimum charge in the country.

CQC evaluation
The Care Quality Commission rated Barnet General Hospital as "good" overall in August 2016. The findings of the report are summarised in the table below:

Abuse inquiries
In November 2013, the Health Secretary Jeremy Hunt announced that Barnet Hospital was being investigated in relation to the Jimmy Savile sexual abuse scandal. The subsequent NHS and DoH investigation concluded that following an extensive search of Trust and public archives, the investigating team found no record of JS being involved with BH, either through fund raising events, VIP visits or charitable donations.

See also
 List of hospitals in England

References

External links

 

Buildings and structures in the London Borough of Barnet
Health in the London Borough of Barnet
NHS hospitals in London